The Daughters of the Dragon are the duo of Colleen Wing and Misty Knight, fictional characters appearing in American comic books published by Marvel Comics. They first appeared as a team in Deadly Hands of Kung Fu #32 (January 1977)  in a story titled Daughters of the Dragon written by Chris Claremont and illustrated by Marshall Rogers. This followed the introduction of each individual character in mid-1970s Iron Fist stories.

Publication history
The pair was first referred to by the name Daughters of the Dragon canonically in Marvel Team-Up #64 (December 1977). In the context of the story, the name comes from an attempted slight from Iron Fist foe Davos, the Steel Serpent, said in a tongue-in-cheek way while he flees from the two heroines. Despite the Daughters of the Dragon being given co-star billing in the issue, they appear in action for only a handful of panels, foreshadowing their status as perennial supporting characters who rarely starred in stories of their own. Since Iron Fist's first series had been cancelled at that time, the two characters followed him into the new Power Man and Iron Fist series (a merging of the Power Man and Iron Fist series), with Colleen and Misty as supporting cast, who operated Knightwing Restorations Inc.

Among the few stories to feature the Daughters of the Dragon as the stars were 8-page stories appearing in Marvel Comics Presents #42 (January 1990), #80 (April 1991), and #149 (March 1994). The first two of these stories were written by former Power Man and Iron Fist writer Mary Jo Duffy.

In late 2005/early 2006 they gained a limited series which introduced both the style and many of the plots and characters that were later featured in the 2006 Heroes for Hire series.

The Daughters of the Dragon received an entry in the All-New Official Handbook of the Marvel Universe A-Z #3 (2006).

Misty Knight and Colleen Wing were featured in the Luke Cage and Iron Fist Netflix series, which take place in a shared universe. Both characters were eventually paired, as in the comic. The success of the duo led Marvel to launch a new Daughters of the Dragon comic in 2018, by Jed MacKay and Travel Foreman. It was released as a digital comic.

In other media

 A Daughters of the Dragon TV series was announced to be in development in 2001, but was never produced. The series would have featured Colleen Wing and two other members.
 Misty Knight and Colleen Wing appear in Marvel's Netflix television series, portrayed by Simone Missick and Jessica Henwick, respectively. Following their introductions in Luke Cage and Iron Fist, the pair return in the miniseries The Defenders.

Collected editions

References

Comics characters introduced in 1977
Fictional duos
Marvel Comics titles
Marvel Comics female superheroes